Herzog is a German-language surname. Notable people with the surname include:

Academia
 Albin Herzog (1852–1909), Swiss mathematician
 Fritz Herzog (1902–2001), American mathematician
 Hanna Herzog (born 1946), sociology professor at Tel Aviv University
 Johann Jakob Herzog (1805–1882), German Protestant theologian
 Marvin Herzog (1927–2013), Yiddish linguist, professor at Columbia University
 T. K. G. Herzog (1880–1961), German bryologist and phytogeographer
 Ze'ev Herzog (born 1941), archaeology professor at Tel Aviv University

Artists, entertainers, film and stage people
 Arthur Herzog, Jr. (1900–1983), American jazz songwriter
 Hermann Ottomar Herzog (1831–1932), German-American artist
 Jens-Daniel Herzog (born 1964), German stage director
 Seth Herzog, American comedian
Rudolph Herzog (born 1973), German film director, producer and writer
 Werner Herzog (born 1942), German: screenwriter, film director, actor and opera director

Politicians and religious leaders
 Chaim Herzog (1918–1997), sixth president of Israel; son of Yitzhak HaLevi Herzog
 Aura Herzog (1928–2022), wife of Chaim Herzog
 Gustav Herzog (born 1958), German SPD politician, member of the Bundestag
 Henry Herzog (1848–1935), American politician
 Isaac (Buzi) Herzog (born 1960), eleventh and current president of Israel, son of Chaim Herzog
 Jakob Herzog (1892–1931), Swiss socialist
 J. B. M. Hertzog (1866–1942), German-South African politician
 Martin H. Herzog, (1878–1971), American politician
 Maurice Herzog (1919–2012), French mountaineer and politician
 Robert Herzog (1823–1886), Polish Roman Catholic bishop
 Roman Herzog (1934–2017), President of Germany from 1994 to 1999
 Ronald Paul Herzog (1942–1942), American Roman Catholic bishop
 Yitzhak HaLevi Herzog (1889–1959), Chief Rabbi of Ireland and later of Israel

Sportspeople and mountaineers
 Andreas Herzog (born 1968), Austrian footballer
 Buck Herzog (1885-1953), American baseball player
 Dieter Herzog (born 1946), German footballer
 Elvira Herzog (born 2000), Swiss footballer
 Maurice Herzog (1919–2012), French mountaineer and politician
 Whitey Herzog (born 1931), U.S. baseball player and Hall of Fame baseball manager

Writers and journalists
 Arthur Herzog (1927–2010), American novelist
 Émile Herzog (1885–1967), Franco-German writer, known by his pen name André Maurois
 Frank Herzog, American retired sportscaster
 Wilhelm Herzog (1884–1960), German historian, dramatist, and pacifist
 Vladimir Herzog (1937–1975), Jewish-Brazilian journalist

Others
 Herzog family
 Jacques Herzog (born 1950), Swiss architect, founder of Herzog & de Meuron
 Karl Herzog (1906–1998), German military officer
 Sofie Herzog (1846–1925), Texas physician
 Todd Herzog (born 1985), winner of Survivor: China

See also
 Ferenc Herczeg (1863–1954), born Franz Herzog, German-Hungarian writer

German-language surnames
Jewish surnames
Surnames from nicknames